Nicholette "Nikki" Gold is a fictional character appearing in American comic books published by Marvel Comics. Nikki first appeared in Marvel Presents #4 (April 1976) and was created by Steve Gerber and Mary Skrenes. 

The character is usually depicted as a woman in the Earth-691 timeline of the fictional Marvel Universe, genetically engineered to live on the planet Mercury.  As such, her character has a superhuman ability to withstand heat and ultraviolet radiation, and can see clearly in very bright light. She is described as bald, although her fictional powers allow her to expel body heat through her head in a low-temperature flame resembling hair in shape. 

The Nikki character was the sixth member of the Guardians of the Galaxy, and noted for her acrobatic and sharp-shooting skill.

Publication history
Mercurians were first seen in The Defenders vol #1, #26, August 1975. Nikki first appeared in Marvel Presents #4 (April, 1976). Writer Steve Gerber recalled, "I wanted to [add] a girl – a Mercurian – because there wasn't one in the group. The conception was, I think, half mine and half Mary Skrenes'." She was first referred to in FOOM #12. At the time Gerber stopped writing Marvel Presents, Nikki still had no clearly defined powers, leaving his successor Roger Stern to fill in that aspect of the character. Stern reflected, "Nikki was the blankest slate. I saw her 'power' as being able to adapt to virtually any environment. Otherwise, how would someone who had been born on the planet Mercury been able to stand - much less turn somersaults - under standard Earth gravity?"

Fictional character biography 
Nicholette "Nikki" Gold was born on the planet Mercury in the 31st century. She was rescued from an abandoned spacecraft by the Guardians of the Galaxy. She joined the Guardians, seeking excitement and adventure after years of solitude aboard the abandoned spacecraft. She later joined with Vance Astro in a metaphysical union in a successful attempt to use the force of human love to destroy the Topographical Man.  The sexual nature of this union embarrassed Vance, but not Nikki.

Nikki traveled to the present with the other Guardians, and assisted the Avengers in battle against Korvac. She traveled to the present again, and battled Hammer and Anvil alongside Spider-Man.

Alongside the Guardians, Nikki later went on a quest to find the lost shield of Captain America, and battled Taserface. She battled the Stark alongside the other Guardians. She encountered Firelord. She battled the super-humanoid team known as Force alongside the Guardians.

During her time on the team, Nikki had a romantic relationship with Charlie-27, though they later amicably separated. She became attracted to later Guardian recruits Firelord and Talon though both simply wished to remain friends.

Powers and abilities 
Nikki is a member of a genetically engineered offshoot of humanity whose traits were designed for survival in the harsh conditions of the planet Mercury. As such, she has the ability to see in intense light, and has a high degree of resistance to heat and most types of radiation.  As she has matured, Nikki has demonstrated an ability to increase the intensity of the flames radiating from her scalp, to the point of being able to briefly project the flames outward as an offensive tactic; she has been shown using this ability to burn the hair from Charlie-27's scalp and eyebrows, scorch opponents such as the evil mutant Blockade, and lay down a wall of flame to repel attackers. Another side effect of Mercurian physiology is a natural body temperature of several hundred degrees; at one point, Nikki took up swimming to temporarily reduce her body temperature for Charlie-27's safety while they were in a romantic relationship.

Nikki has achieved extensive proficiency in hand-to-hand combat and proficiency in gymnastics and sharp-shooting. She is self-taught from memory tapes.

Nikki is often armed with a neuronic frequency stun gun, a laser pistol, and various handgun-type weapons as needed.

In other media

Video games
 The Nikki character appears as a playable character in Lego Marvel Super Heroes 2 as part of the "Classic Guardians of the Galaxy" DLC pack.

 A younger version of the Nikki character appears in Marvel's Guardians of the Galaxy as the adopted daughter of a Kree Captain named Ko-Rel.

Notes

References

External links
 Nicholette "Nikki" Gold, an extensive biography with exhaustive references

Characters created by Steve Gerber
Comics characters introduced in 1976
Fictional characters from the Solar System
Fictional genetically engineered characters
Guardians of the Galaxy characters
Fiction set on Mercury (planet)
Marvel Comics female superheroes